Stephanie Marie Colón Pascual (born 27 January 1992) is an American-born Puerto Rican footballer who plays as a midfielder. She has been a member of the Puerto Rico women's national team.

Early life
Colón was raised in Babylon, New York.

International career
Colón capped for Puerto Rico at senior level during the 2016 CONCACAF Women's Olympic Qualifying Championship.

References

1992 births
Living people
Women's association football midfielders
Puerto Rican women's footballers
Puerto Rico women's international footballers
American women's soccer players
Soccer players from New York (state)
Sportspeople from Suffolk County, New York
People from Babylon, New York
American sportspeople of Puerto Rican descent
Duquesne Dukes women's soccer players